is the seventh studio album of Japanese singer-songwriter Miho Komatsu. It was released on 26 January 2005 under Giza Studio.

Background
Album includes previous 4 released singles, since Tsubasa wa Nakutemo till I~dare ka.

The single Tsubasa wa Nakutemo has received remix under subtitle Extravagant mix by Mr.Lee.

Namida Kirari Tobase has received as well new album arrangement under title album mix. Compared to the single release, in the beginning the key chords are higher and in the middle of song guitar solo was specially added.

Charting performance
The album debuted at number 30 on Oricon Weekly Albums Charts with 9,916 sold copies. The album charted for 4 weeks and totally sold 13,807 copies.

Track listing

In media
I: Dareka...
for Nihon TV music program Ongaku Senshi MUSIC FIGHTER as theme song

References

2005 albums
2004 songs
2005 songs
Miho Komatsu songs
Songs written by Miho Komatsu
Giza Studio albums
Being Inc. albums
Japanese-language albums
Albums produced by Daiko Nagato